Dominic Adam Brunt (born 15 April 1970) is an English actor, director and producer, best known for portraying the role of Paddy Kirk in the ITV soap opera Emmerdale. For his role as Paddy, Brunt has been nominated in various categories at the British Soap Awards, Inside Soap Awards and the National Television Awards. As well as acting, Brunt also produces and directs horror films alongside Joanne Mitchell; he also co-hosts an annual zombie film festival with Emmerdale co-star Mark Charnock.

Early and personal life
Brunt was born on 15 April 1970 in Macclesfield, Cheshire. He was educated at Accrington Moorhead Sports College and the Bristol Old Vic Theatre School, where he met his wife Joanne Mitchell. Brunt and Mitchell have two children together; when their son Danny was eight months old, he underwent an operation after being diagnosed with a heart condition.

Brunt is a fan of zombie horror films, and with Emmerdale co-star Mark Charnock, the pair conduct an annual zombie film festival in Leeds.

He is also a supporter of Manchester City Football Club.

Career
Since 1997, Dominic Brunt has played the role of Paddy Kirk in the ITV soap opera Emmerdale. For this role, Brunt was nominated in the category of Best Actor at the 2011 British Soap Awards, as well as receiving nominations for Best Comedy Performance in 2009, 2010 and 2013. At the 2019 British Soap Awards, Brunt was nominated for three awards. He received a longlist nomination for Best Actor, and shortlist nominations for Best Male Dramatic Performance and Best On-Screen Partnership, the latter with Lucy Pargeter, who portrays his on-screen wife Chas Dingle. Brunt directed and starred in a zombie film called Before Dawn which was made in 2012, and directed Bait (2014) and Attack of the Adult Babies (2017) with Laurence R. Harvey and Lucas Briand in a secondary role. Dominic also featured in the British movie Inbred (2011), playing the role of chainsaw-wielding Podge.

Filmography

Awards and nominations

References

External links
 

1970 births
Living people
People from Macclesfield
Male actors from Cheshire
20th-century English male actors
21st-century English male actors
English male soap opera actors